Lucena is a Spanish city and municipality, in the province of Córdoba, autonomous community of Andalusia, 60 km southeast of the provincial capital Córdoba.
Its circa 42,000 people makes Lucena the second largest municipality in the province after Córdoba. It is located at the conjunction of important highways in the geographical center of Andalusia. People from Lucena are called lucentinos.
The city was originally known as Eliossana, etymologically reinterpreted as deriving from the Hebrew   Elí hoshanna, "May God save us". The name in Arabic is  Al-Yussana.

Geography
Lucena is situated on the Lucena River, a minor tributary of the Genil, on  an important crossroads at the very center of Andalusia.

Over 90 percent of the population lives to the northeast of the city district (término municipal).

History
In early times Lucena was inhabited almost exclusively by Jews who had arrived together with its founders; hence it was called "Jews' City", a nickname also applied to Granada and Tarragona. The Jews of Lucena, who carried on extensive trade and industries, were, according to the 11th-century Muslim geographer, Mohamed al-Edrisi, richer than those of any other city. They enjoyed the same freedom as their correligionists in the large Muslim cities. Their rabbi, who was elected by the entire community, was granted special privileges and acted as judge in the civil and criminal cases arising in the community. The Jews lived peaceably until the Almoravides came into power.

At the beginning of the 11th century, several important Jewish scholars lived in Lucena. Isaac Alfasi founded a large Talmudic academy in Lucena, and here also Isaac ibn Ghayyat, Isaac ibn Albalia, and Joseph ibn Migash were prominent.

Lucena was taken from the Moors in 1240 by king Ferdinand III of Castile, but it remained as frontier village for centuries. In fact, it was in the attempt to recapture it that King Boabdil of Granada was taken prisoner in 1483.

The parish church dates from the ending of the 15th century. Our Lady of Araceli is an image brought from Rome in the 16th century and is the patron of Lucena, canonically crowned in 1948.

The chief industries are the manufacture of furniture, industrial refrigerators, wine, bronze lamps and pottery, especially the large earthenware jars (tinajas) used in the past throughout Spain for the storage of oil and wine, some of which hold more than 300 gallons. Matches also used to be made there. There is considerable trade in agricultural produce. The horse fair in September was famous throughout Andalusia, but since the last decades of the 20th century there is only a fair like in most towns in Andalusia.

This town gives its name to a city of the Philippines islands Lucena City and another city at state of Paraiba in the northeast of Brazil, also called Lucena. There is a separate city in southern Brazil called "Presidente Lucena,"  a name which came from Henrique Pereira de Lucena (born in Recife, capital of the state of Pernambuco. He later nominated Barão de Lucena (or Baron of Lucena) who governed the provinces of Pernambuco, Bahia and Rio Grande do Sul in the 19th century during the period of Brazilian Empire.

Also from Lucena (Córdoba) was Abraham of Lucena (Portuguese: Abraão de Lucena), a rabbi who founded the first synagogue in the United States.

Easter celebrations - Semana Santa

Easter, or Semana Santa, is the most important celebration taking place yearly in Lucena, just like in most parts of Spain. However, Lucena's Semana Santa, declared of Special Tourist Interest, is well known for its peculiar and unique way of porting or carrying the "pasos" or processions. All these "pasos" are formed by at least one sculpture, most of the time hundreds of years old. They are carried on shoulders as nowhere else in Andalusia, all porters uncovered (unlike the Seville way) and at the same level (unlike the Málaga way). The way processions are carried in Lucena is called "santería", and it is a particular trait to the city. Santería can best be appreciated on Easter Thursday (Jueves Santo) where 9 "pasos" take the streets. Not to be missed are the Cristo de la Columna, by most renowned sculptor Pedro Roldán, created in 1675, and the impressive Cristo de la Sangre, brought from the Spanish Americas in the beginning of the 17th century.

Best Semana Santa days in Lucena are Palm Sunday (5), Tuesday (7), Thursday (9) and Saturday (1).

Palm Sunday sees 5 "pasos" on the streets belonging to 3 different congregations and churches. They come together at a certain point creating a single procession. Palm Sunday highlights the Cristo de la Bondad and the Oración en el Huerto and the Madonna de la Estrella.

Monday is all consecrated to one only congregation (cofradía), that of the Franciscan brothers. The "pasos" have their quarters at a very pretty Franciscan convent in downtown Lucena. Highlights this day are the "trono" (platform in which the sculptures are carried) of the venerated Medinaceli Christ, and the Virgen de Piedra, a Madonna like that of Michelangelo in the Vatican in Rome.

Tuesday sees 3 different congregations and 7 different "pasos" on the streets of Lucena. First one, the Carmine congregation, founded in 1606 with 3 very old, historical and peculiar "pasos" leaving from the Carmen church in Southern Lucena. Not to be missed the "Virgen de los Dolores", of the old school of Granada sculptures, as well as the "Señor de la Humildad". This congregation is one of the oldest in the city and have kept the same traditions as they were centuries ago.

The two other congregations have their site in the very central St. Matthew's Cathedral, in Plaza Nueva. The Servitas congregation, founded in 1724 but most important, the "Peace & Love" congregation, starring the "Madonna of Peace & Love", one of the most beautiful, balanced and prettiest "pasos" all week as well as the "Christ of Peace & Love". Tuesday is really worth a visit.

Wednesday is currently the poorest day in Lucena. Only one congregation, that of "El Valle", and 2 "pasos" only on the streets. But this refers only until midnight arrives and "Jueves Santo" begins, the most complete and traditional day in Lucena.

Thursday at midnight at St. Matthew's Cathedral takes place one of the most awaited moments of all week: the "Cristo del Silencio" comes out from church in silence and with all lights shut down. A very special moment that builds the closest link between the Andalusian Holy Week tradition and that of Castilian background. The "Cristo del Silencio" is the closest experience to a Castilian procession you can have in Lucena. But this is just the start. In the early afternoon, the second congregations starts its procession from the very small "Dios Padre" chapel in Eastern Lucena. 3 very peculiar "pasos" compose this congregation, 2 of which are unique to Lucena: that of the "Holy Faith Allegory" and also that of "Jesus washing St Peter's feet".

And now we come to the most awaited moment in the whole Easter Week tradition of Lucena. The most venerated and traditional "paso" is about to start its procession: the "Cristo de la Columna", by Pedro Roldán, comes out of St. Jacques church always punctual. The way this "paso" comes out, the way it is particularly carried, and all the "saetas" (flamenco-kind prayers that are sung as a virgin or christ is being processioned in Andalusia) that are sung during the whole evening-night are by themselves a reason to pay a visit to Lucena on that day. But this is not yet finished. The "Cristo de la Sangre", one of the most serious, traditional, respected and historical "paso" there is in Lucena. Coming out of the St. Francis church in downtown Lucena. In total, there are 9 "pasos" on Thursday in Lucena. And best of all, they all come together in Alcaide street Las Torres (downtown) where they head for Plaza Nueva (Main Square) before taking El Peso street, where they finally separate.

Thursday and Good Friday traditionally come together. There are just a few hours without "pasos" on the street since those of Thursday come back to church at 2:30 am and the next one, Nazareno Christ comes out at 6:00 am. Nazareno congregation is composed of 6 "pasos". The Nazareno itself is a very old and very much venerated sculpture of Renaissance style. The congregation was founded in 1599, one of the oldest in town. It has also kept the good old flavors of the past.

Saturday, there is only one congregation and one paso with it. The "Soledad". This congregation is the oldest one in Lucena, formed in 1564. Very pretty procession, well organized, balanced and serious.

Sunday, as usual, the "Resurrection" congregation puts an end to a whole week of celebrations.

See also
Battle of Lucena

Notable people
Isaac ibn Ghiyyat (1038–1089)
Joseph ibn Migash (Seville, 1077-1141), was a rabbi, posek and a rosh yeshiva who lived in Lucena most of his lifetime.
Luis Ramírez de Lucena (1465-1530), a leading Spanish chess player, who wrote the oldest existing printed book on chess. The Lucena position is named after him.
Luis Barahona de Soto (1548-1595), poet, a friend of Miguel de Cervantes.
Antonio Mohedano (1561-1625, Antequera), painter of the Renaissance period.
Francisco Hurtado Izquierdo (1699-1725, Priego de Córdoba), architect, author of the tabernacle in the Granada Charterhouse.
José María Hinojosa, "El Tempranillo" (1805-1833), bandolero.
Paco de Lucena (1859-1898), flamenco guitarist
Victor Perez (Director) (born 1981), Spanish director, producer and digital film compositor

References

External links

Official website
Culture House
Young House
Lucena
LucenaEmpresas, Guia online de Lucena

Municipalities in the Province of Córdoba (Spain)
Historic Jewish communities